Adriaan Jacobus (Ad) Koppejan (born 2 October 1962, in Zoutelande) is a former Dutch politician. As a member of the Christian Democratic Appeal (Christen-Democratisch Appèl) he was an MP from 30 November 2006 to 19 September 2012. He focused on matters of fishery and water policy, administrative burden and corporate social responsibility.

Koppejan is a member of the Protestant Church in the Netherlands (PKN).

References 
  Parlement.com biography

1962 births
Living people
Christian Democratic Appeal politicians
Protestant Church Christians from the Netherlands
Members of the House of Representatives (Netherlands)
People from Veere
21st-century Dutch politicians